This is a list of albums and singles released by the Chilean Pop rock band Kudai, signed in a record deal with the label EMI and Capitol Records. The band's name comes from the Mapudungun word küdaw, meaning "work".

They released three albums in all latinoamerica Vuelo in 2004, Sobrevive in 2006 and Nadha in 2008, this is the first album of the band in released in United States.

The group is popular mostly among teenagers in South America, the Caribbean, Central America, and Mexico.

Albums

Studio albums

Live albums

Compilation albums

Singles

DVDs

Notes

References

External links
Official site (in Spanish)
Kudai on Myspace

Pop music group discographies
Discographies of Chilean artists